The first USS Raccoon (SP-506) was a United States Navy patrol vessel in commission from 1917 to 1919.

Raccoon was launched in 1915 as a private wooden-hulled motorboat of the same name by George Lawley & Son at Neponset, Massachusetts, and completed that year. On 5 May 1917, the U.S. Navy acquired her from her owner, Francis W. Fabyan of Cambridge, Massachusetts, for use as a section patrol vessel during World War I. She was commissioned as USS Raccoon (SP-506) the same day.

Raccoon operated on section patrol duty at New London, Connecticut, until December 1917, when she was transferred to Newport, Rhode Island. She patrolled at Newport through the end of World War I.

Raccoons armament was removed on 3 December 1918, and she was returned to Fabyan on 17 January 1919 and resumed service as a private motorboat. Following two subsequent changes in ownership, she was renamed Constance in 1924. She disappeared from mercantile registers in 1925.

References

Department of the Navy Naval History and Heritage Command Online Library of Selected Images: U.S. Navy Ships - Listed by hull number: "SP" #s and "ID" #s -- World War I Era Patrol Vessels and other Acquired Ships and Craft numbered from SP-500 through SP-599
NavSource Online: Section Patrol Craft Photo Archive: Raccoon (SP 506)

Patrol vessels of the United States Navy
World War I patrol vessels of the United States
Ships built in Boston
1915 ships